Ohio has more than 80 high schools with varsity ice hockey teams that participate in interscholastic competition, as well as more than 20 club high school teams composed of players from numerous high schools in a specific area. Since 1978, ice hockey has been an officially sanctioned sport by the Ohio High School Athletic Association (OHSAA). The club teams play under USA Hockey sanction and also have both junior varsity and varsity divisions.

State champions 

 * 1999 Title game was won by St. John's Jesuit High School, but later forfeited due to the use of an ineligible player.  It was the first state championship game forfeiture in the history of the OHSAA.
 ** co-champions - Game called a 1-1 tie after 7 overtimes

Conferences 
Capital Hockey Conference
Great Lakes Hockey League
Greater Cleveland High School Hockey League
Northwest Hockey Conference
Southwest Ohio High School Hockey League

References 

High school ice hockey in the United States